Adverum Biotechnologies, formerly known as Avalanche Biotechnologies, is a publicly traded (NASDAQ:ADVM) clinical stage gene therapy company located in Redwood City, California. The company is targeting unmet medical needs for serious ocular and rare diseases, including wet age-related macular degeneration (wet AMD).

History
Avalanche Biotechnologies was founded in 2006 by Tom Chalberg, Mark Blumenkranz, Mitchell Finer, and Steven Schwartz. Avalanche went public through an IPO in 2014, raising $102 million.

In 2015, co-founder Tom Chalberg stepped down as CEO following Phase IIa trial results that were labeled as "iffy".

In May 2016, Avalanche acquired Annapurna Therapeutics and changed its name to Adverum Biotechnologies. It also changed its ticker symbol on the Nasdaq exchange from AAVL to ADVM. In October 2016, former Annapurna Therapeutics CEO Amber Salzman became CEO of Adverum.

In May 2018, CEO Amber Salzman left Adverum, and Chief Medical Officer Athena Countouriotis resigned after less than one year in the job. In October 2018, Leone Patterson was named the new CEO of Adverum.

In September 2019, Adverum announced six-month data from the first cohort of its phase I trial. The stock price dropped 50% due to investor concerns over deterioration of vision that these trial subjects suffered, as well as several reports of occular inflammation.

In June 2020, Laurent Fischer replaced Patterson as CEO of Adverum.

In January 2022, the FDA granted Orphan Drug Designation to Adverum's ADVM-062, developed as a single intravitreal administration for blue-cone monochromacy by delivering a functional copy of the OPN1LW gene.

In September 2022, Adverum announced that its first patient was dosed in the LUNA phase 2 clinical trial; the trial evaluates development for the treatment of wet age-related macular degeneration.

References

2006 establishments in California
American companies established in 2006
Biotechnology companies established in 2006
Biotechnology companies of the United States
Companies listed on the Nasdaq
Companies based in Redwood City, California
Technology companies based in the San Francisco Bay Area